Z10 may refer to:
 BlackBerry Z10, a smartphone
 CAIC Z-10, an attack helicopter developed by the People's Republic of China.
 German destroyer Z10 Hans Lody
 IBM System z10, a mainframe
 Motorola Motorizr Z10, a mobile phone